George Carl Zackert (December 24, 1884 – February 18, 1977) nicknamed "Zeke", was a professional baseball pitcher. He played parts of two seasons in Major League Baseball for the St. Louis Cardinals (1911–1912).

External links

Major League Baseball pitchers
St. Louis Cardinals players
Lincoln Ducklings players
Waterloo Cubs players
Hutchinson Salt Packers players
Lincoln Treeplanters players
Waterloo Lulus players
Lincoln Railsplitters players
Seattle Giants players
Muscatine Wallopers players
Muscatine Buttonmakers players
Muscatine Muskies players
Waterloo Jays players
Waterloo Shamrocks players
Baseball players from Vermont
1884 births
1977 deaths